Cimindi Station (CMD) is a class II railway station located in Campaka, Andir, Bandung. The station, which is located at an altitude of +380 meters, is included in the Operation Area II Bandung and is the westernmost station in the city of Bandung.

Since April 6, 1999, the station uses electric signaling produced by Alstom.

Services
The following is a list of train services at the Cimindi Station.

Passenger services 
Local economy
Lokal Bandung Raya, destination of – as well as from and purpose – (only most of the specific itinerary)

References

External links

Buildings and structures in Bandung
Railway stations in West Java
Railway stations opened in 1884